Roderick Watkins, DL (born 1964) is a composer and the Vice Chancellor (and former Deputy Vice Chancellor (Research and Innovation)) at Anglia Ruskin University, England. He was appointed to the University in 2014 and served briefly as Pro-Vice Chancellor and Dean of the Faculty of Arts, Law and Social Sciences. He was appointed as Deputy Vice Chancellor for Research and Innovation at Anglia Ruskin in 2015 before becoming Vice Chancellor in 2019. He was previously Professor of Composition and Contemporary Music at Canterbury Christ Church University, Kent, England from 2005 to July 2014, where he was Programme Director for undergraduate Music and taught composition and contemporary music.

Watkins was educated at Gresham's School and then took a degree in Philosophy and Composition at Oberlin in the US before studying at the Royal Academy of Music, where he won all of the Academy's main prizes for composition, completed his doctorate and became a Leverhulme Fellow.  His teachers included Hans Werner Henze, Richard Hoffmann, and Paul Patterson. He also spent a year at IRCAM in Paris and later returned to IRCAM as a “compositeur en recherche” (research composer).

He was appointed Deputy Lieutenant of Cambridgeshire in 2021[[Roderick was appointed a Deputy Lieutenant of Cambridgeshire in 2021]].

Compositions

Watkins' compositions include a full-length opera, The Juniper Tree, premiered at the Munich Biennale in April 1997, and given its UK premiere at the Almeida festival in July of that year by the London Sinfonietta conducted by Markus Stenz.  In 2003 he produced the electronic material for Henze's opera L’Upupa.

Orchestral compositions include Red Light, Who Walked Between, Still, and Light's Horizon.

Electro-acoustic compositions include The Looking Glass and Sound in Space.

Chamber music includes A Valediction: of Weeping, Last Light (for clarinet and piano), and At the Horizon (for flute and piano), a Clarinet Quintet and Breath. A piece for harpsichord and electronics, entitled After Scarlatti, was premiered on 29 April 2009 at the Sounds New Festival in Canterbury.

References
Independent review of Watkins' The Juniper Tree (3 July 1997), accessed 5 February 2010
Review of Watkins' The Juniper Tree in The Musical Times, Vol. 138, No. 1852 (Jun., 1997), pp. 42-44,  accessed 5 February 2010

External links
 Staff profile at Anglia Ruskin University, accessed 11 May 2016
Staff profile at Canterbury Christ Church University, accessed 5 February 2010
Munich Biennale page on The Juniper tree, accessed 5 February 2010

1964 births
Alumni of the Royal Academy of Music
Academics of Canterbury Christ Church University
People educated at Gresham's School
20th-century classical composers
English classical composers
21st-century classical composers
Living people
Musicians from Kent
English male classical composers
20th-century English composers
20th-century British male musicians
21st-century British male musicians